Ado Vabbe (19 March 1892 – 20 April 1961) was an Estonian painter, graphics artist, and teacher.

Ado Vabbe is known for bringing abstraction back home to Estonia after being educated in the Anton Ažbe art school in Munich from 1911 to 1913. Active as an artist, he became better known as an art teacher and was a strong influence on many modern Estonian artists. His Paraphrases are considered an important turning point in the history of Estonian art.

Vabbe died in Tartu.

References

1892 births
1961 deaths
People from Tapa, Estonia
People from the Governorate of Estonia
20th-century Estonian painters
20th-century Estonian male artists